Conservatives Concerned About the Death Penalty (CCATDP) is a national network of conservative Republicans and Libertarians calling for a re-examination of the American system of capital punishment.

Organization

CCATDP engages in advocacy, education, and outreach to conservative, Republican, and Libertarian leaders and organizations. CCATDP provides a national forum for them to express their concerns about the death penalty.

CCATDP is a project of Equal Justice USA, a non-profit organization working on criminal justice issues.

Activities

CCATDP officially debuted at the Conservative Political Action Conference (CPAC) in 2013.  Since that time, its national coordinators have been meeting with conservative, Republican, and Libertarian leaders across the country and they have exhibited and spoken at the national meetings of the Republican Liberty Caucus, the Young Republican National Federation, Young Americans for Liberty, the Liberty Political Action Conference, State Policy Network, CPAC St. Louis, CPAC, and the Faith and Freedom Coalition’s Road to Majority conference. They have also attended several evangelical conferences.

Since CCTADP's launch in early 2013, several states began forming their own state-level Conservatives Concerned about the Death Penalty groups, including Ohio, Louisiana, North Carolina, Nebraska, Washington, Kentucky, Tennessee, Georgia, Florida, Kansas, Wyoming, Montana, and Utah.

History

CCATDP was first created in Montana in 2009 when individual Republican legislators realized that they were not alone in having concerns about the death penalty. As word spread outside of Montana, there was interest in forming a national group.

March 14–16, 2013 CCATDP attended the first of eight consecutive Conservative Political Action Conferences.

In August 2013, Ron Paul supported CCTAPD's efforts.

October 2013, CCTAPD formed a strategic partnership with Young Americans for Liberty.

April 15, 2015, the Nebraska CCATDP held a news conference at the capitol in Lincoln with several Republican state senators to announce they would support a bill to repeal the state’s death penalty. On May 27, 2015 Nebraska’s unicameral legislature voted 32-15 in favor of LB-268 to override the governor’s veto and eliminate the death penalty. In a November 2016 referendum Nebraskans voted to reverse the repeal measure.

January 19, 2017, the Georgia CCATDP was launched in a news conference at the state capitol in Atlanta.

June 14, 2017, the Florida CCATDP was launched during a news conference in Orlando.

February 19, 2019, CCATDP’s national manager testified before the New Hampshire House Criminal Justice and Public Safety Committee on HB455, a bill to end the death penalty in the state. On March 26 CCATDP’s national manager returned to The Granite to testify in favor of the same bill before the state Senate Judiciary Committee. On May 30 both houses of the New Hampshire Legislature voted to override the governor’s veto of the bill (40% of the senate Republican caucus voted for repeal) and end capital punishment.

The First Annual National Meeting of CCATDP was held in New Orleans, Louisiana September 6–8, 2019. Conservative activists from a dozen states discussed the growing movement of conservatives and Republican state legislators who believe the death penalty violates the basic tenets of their beliefs.

October 28, 2019, CCATDP released a Conservative Statement of Support to End the Death Penalty signed by more than 250 politically active conservatives from 44 states.

January 2, 2020, the Wyoming CCATDP was launched at a news conference in Cheyenne.

January 27, 2020, CCATDP’s national manager testified before the Colorado Senate Committee on Judiciary about SB20-100 a bill to repeal the death penalty. On January 31 the Colorado Senate passed the bill and three Republican votes made passage possible. The House approved the bill in February and on March 23 Gov. Jared Polis signed it into law, ending Colorado’s death penalty.

February 5, 2020, the Louisiana CCATDP was launched at a news conference outside of the state capitol.

February 18, 2020, the Ohio CCATDP was launched at a state capitol news conference with the group being endorsed by conservative Republican leaders such as former Gov. Bob Taft, Attorney General Jim Petro, and Congressman Pat Tiberi.

References

Conservative organizations in the United States
Political organizations based in the United States
Charities based in New York City
Anti–death penalty organizations in the United States